This article contains a list of locomotives and railbuses of the Deutsche Reichsbahn (East Germany) (DR) according to the numbering system introduced by the DR on 1 July 1970.

Following the October 1990 reunification of Germany, the DR's locomotives and railbuses were incorporated (and renumbered) on 1 January 1992 into the classification system of the West German Deutsche Bundesbahn (DB), originally issued on 1 January 1968, in preparation for the merger of the two German national railways that took place on 1 January 1994. This renumbering was also described as the 'locomotive classification of the Deutsche Bahn' as a number of changes and additions to the DB's 1968 system were needed.

Classification before 1970: see also DRG classification system.

Steam locomotives 

In the DR numbering plan the following additional practices were common:
xx.6xxx   locomotives, that originated from former private railways.

From 1970 the following sub-classes for all steam locomotives were introduced, the locomotive number always being four digits long:
xx.0   locomotives with oil-firing
xx.1–8 locomotives with grate firing
xx.9   locomotives with coal dust firing

Diesel locomotives and small locomotives 

 * The classification 199 was first introduced in 1973 .

Diesel railbuses

Electric locomotives 

With the exception of the BR 251 all locomotives are designed for 15 kV/16.7 Hz AC.

Electric railcars

Accumulator cars

See also 
Deutsche Reichsbahn (East Germany)
UIC classification

Literature 
Franz Rittig, Manfred Weisbrod: Baureihe 232 – Die berühmte Ludmilla (= Eisenbahn Journal Extra. Ausgabe 2 / 2012). Verlagsgruppe Bahn, Fürstenfeldbruck 2012, ISBN 978-3-89610-363-5.

Klaus-Jürgen Halle: Die Großdiesellokomotive V 180 – Das Erfolgsmodell aus Babelsberg. In: Die Deutsche Reichsbahn – 45 Jahre Eisenbahngeschichte in der DDR, Kapitel 5.2, Ausgabe 1 / 2012, Geramond-Verlag, Gilching

References

External links
 There is an English-language discussion forum at Railways of Germany

Locomotives of Germany
Rail transport in East Germany
Railway locomotive-related lists
German railway-related lists